The 2017–18 Duke Blue Devils women's basketball team represented Duke University during the 2017–18 NCAA Division I women's basketball season. Their head coach was Joanne P. McCallie in her 11th season at Duke. The Blue Devils played theirs home games at Cameron Indoor Stadium in Durham, North Carolina as members of the Atlantic Coast Conference. They finished the season 24–9, 11–5 in ACC play to finish in a tie for fourth place. They lost in the quarterfinals of the ACC women's tournament to NC State. They received at-large bid of the NCAA women's tournament where they defeated Belmont and Georgia before losing to Connecticut in the Sweet Sixteen.

Roster

Rankings

Schedule and results

|-
!colspan=12 style="background:#001A57; color:#FFFFFF;"| Exhibition

|-
!colspan=12 style="background:#001A57; color:#FFFFFF;"| Non-conference regular season

|-
!colspan=12 style="background:#001A57; color:#FFFFFF;"| ACC Regular Season

|-
!colspan=12 style="background:#001A57;"| ACC Women's Tournament

|-
!colspan=12 style="background:#001A57;"| NCAA Women's Tournament

Source

See also
 2017–18 Duke Blue Devils men's basketball team

References

Duke Blue Devils women's basketball seasons
Duke
Duke